Fred Cortes (1921-1964) was a Filipino actor who was a favorite leading man of Lvn Pictures before World War II.

Cortes film debut was under Lvn Pictures Nag-iisang Sangla. His second movie team-up was with another Lvn star Mila del Sol for Angelita.

He made one movie under Excelsior Pictures with Arsenia Francisco, a love story movie Babalik ka Rin aka You Will Come back.

In 1941 he made Ibong Adarna with Mila, in 1942 Nina Bonita again with Mila and 1943's Tia Juana.

His comeback role was in 1950's His Darkest Hour under Lebran Pictures.

Osburn was married to actress Anita Linda. He died in 1964.

Early life 
Original name was Fred Louis Osburn; Cortes was his screen name. His Mother, Virginia Najera Sancho, married a soldier who served in the war. Cortes was the 4th child of 7, his older siblings being Henry, Richard, and Gertrude, and Gloria, Josephine, and Charles were his younger siblings.

Filmography

1940 – Nag-iisang Sangla  [Lvn]
1941 – Angelita [Lvn]
1941 - Hiyas ng Dagat  [Lvn]
1941 - Rosalina  [Lvn]
1941 - Villa Hermosa  [LVN]
1941 - Babalik ka rin  [Excelsior]
1941 - Ibong Adarna  [Lvn] as Don Juan
1942 - Nina Bonita  [Lvn]
1943 - Tia Juana  [Lvn]
1950 - His Darkest Hour  [Lebran]

External links

1921 births
1964 deaths
Filipino male film actors